United Arab Airlines Flight 869 may refer to:
 United Arab Airlines Flight 869 (1962), crashed on 19 July 1962
 United Arab Airlines Flight 869 (1963), crashed on 28 July 1963

Flight number disambiguation pages